Julie Halard-Decugis was the defending champion, but was defeated in the quarterfinals by Tamarine Tanasugarn.

Lisa Raymond won the title, defeating Tanasugarn in the final 6–2, 6–7(7–9), 6–4.

Seeds
The top eight seeds receive a bye into the second round.

  Nathalie Tauziat (semifinals)
  Julie Halard-Decugis (quarterfinals)
  Jennifer Capriati (quarterfinals)
  Silvija Talaja (third round)
  Nathalie Dechy (second round)
  Lisa Raymond (Champion)
  Anne-Gaëlle Sidot (quarterfinals)
  Kristina Brandi (quarterfinals)
  Anne Kremer (third round)
  Alexandra Stevenson (first round)
  Tatiana Panova (first round)
  Magüi Serna (third round)
  Nicole Pratt (second round)
  Anastasia Myskina (third round)
  Mirjana Lučić (first round)
  Tamarine Tanasugarn (final)

Qualifying

Draw

Finals

Top half

Section 1

Section 2

Bottom half

Section 3

Section 4

References
 2000 DFS Classic Draws
 ITF Tournament Page 
 ITF singles results page

DFS Classic - Singles
Singles